Sabine Haubitz and Stefanie Zoche were two German artists who worked together as Haubitz + Zoche from 1998 to 2014.  Their partnership ended with the death of Haubitz from an accident in March 2014.  

Haubitz + Zoche produced photographic works, videos and site-specific installations.  Haubitz studied fine arts in Berlin and Munich, Zoche in Perpignan, France, and London. The artists' duo has realized photographic series and site specific installations investigating architecture and public space. In recent years they focused on environmental issues such as climate change and resources.

Haubitz + Zoche participated in numerous national and international exhibitions. In 2012, their video sculpture "Vertigo" was presented at the Havanna Biennial in Havana, Cuba. In 2011 Haubitz + Zoche were nominated for the Prix Pictet. Their photobook "Sinai Hotels" was awarded the German Photobook Prize in 2007. Haubitz + Zoche received The Kodak award and project grants from Kulturwerk VG Bildkunst and Kulturreferat München.

Selected solo exhibitions
2018 Postkoloniale Erleuchtung, Zephyr, Mannheim

2018 Hybrid Modernism, Île d‘en face, Galerie Confluence, Nantes, Frankreich

2014 Hybrid Modernism. Movie Theatres in South India, Nusser & Baumgart, München

2012 Facelift, Landesmuseum Linz, Österreich 

2010 Alice und Aladin oder die Logik der Attraktion, Kunstmuseum Heidenheim  
2010 Facelift, Galerie Nusser & Baumgart, Munich 
2009 Landungssteg, Citybridge Hallein, Hochbauamt Salzburg, Austria  
2008 Schiffbruch, Tod und Teufel, Neue Galerie im Höhmannhaus, Augsburg 
2008 Sinai Hotels, Architekturzentrum Vienna 
2007 Lighthouse Project, Kunsthallen Nikolaj, Copenhagen 
2007 above sea level, Goethe Institut Copenhagen 
2006 touch and go, Walter Storms Galerie, Munich 
2004 dentro lo specchio, Studio la Città, Verona  
2003 Wasserspiegel und Bühnen, foundation noname, Rotterdam, Netherlands 
2002 shift, Maximiliansforum, Munich 
2001 Spion, Neue Galerie Dachau  
2000 Leuchtkästen, Walter Storms Galerie, Munich 
1999 Blue Boxes, Galerie Zink, Regensburg

Selected group exhibitions
2013 Vertigo, EMSCHERKUNST, Duisburg 

2012 Vertigo, Havana Biennial 

2010 Dreamlands, Centre Georges Pompidou, Paris

2010 Rethink Kakotopia, Tensta Konsthall, Stockholm
2009 Rethink Kakotopia, Nikolaj, Copenhagen Contemporary Art Center  
2008 The Yamuna Blues, 48 °C public.art.ecology,  public art, Delhi, India 
2007 Fokus Ägypten, Kunstverein Hildesheim 
2007 Fotosommer, Württembergischer Kunstverein, Stuttgart 
2006 Gletscherdämmerung, climatic change and its consequences, art and science, Munich 
2005 Wasser, Kunsthalle der Hypo-Kulturstiftung, Munich 
2004 swimming pools, Kunstmuseum Heidenheim

Public works
2014 Modell Lucy, sculpture, Bayreuth/>
2009 Landungssteg, sculpture, Hallein, Hochbauamt Salzburg, Austria 
2008 Turmspringer, interactive videoinstallation, Forum Duisburg 
2008 Adhäsion ist des Wassers Eigenschaft, einen festen Körper nass zu machen, FH Nuremberg 
2005 Reflections, site specific installations, video and photography, Bankhaus Wölbern, Hamburg 
2004 Pixeltransfer, interactive light installation, Universität für Biologie, Martinsried 
2002 Luftsprung, photographic installation, Deka Bank, Luxembourg

External links
 
 
 art facts
 artists web site
 Goethe Institute

German artist groups and collectives
Photographers from Munich